Mathilde Gremaud  (born 8 February 2000) is an Olympic Swiss freestyle skier and eight time X Games medalist. On February 28, 2023, she became the first freestyle skier to hold both slopestyle World and Olympic Champion titles after winning gold in both events.

Early life 
Gremaud was born on February 8, 2000, in Fribourg, Switzerland.

Career 
Gremaud competed in the World Championships 2017. She competed at the FIS Freestyle Ski and Snowboarding World Championships 2021, winning a silver medal in Slopestyle.

She competed in the 2018 Winter Olympics and took the silver medal in women's Slopestyle.

Gremaud won gold in big air at the Winter X Games in 2017, 2019, and 2021. She won silver medals in big air and slopestyle in 2020. In 2019, she won bronze in big air.

In 2020, Gremaud became the first woman to land a switch double cork 1440 in competition history.

At the 2022 Winter Olympics, Gremaud won the gold medal in slopestyle and the bronze medal in big air.

Gremaud was coached by Swiss freeski coach Misra Noto Torniainen for the 2018 Winter Olympics. Torniainen would later coach China's Eileen Gu for the 2022 Winter Olympics.

References

External links

2000 births
Living people
People from Fribourg
Swiss female freestyle skiers
Olympic freestyle skiers of Switzerland
Freestyle skiers at the 2018 Winter Olympics
Freestyle skiers at the 2022 Winter Olympics
Medalists at the 2018 Winter Olympics
Medalists at the 2022 Winter Olympics
Olympic gold medalists for Switzerland
Olympic silver medalists for Switzerland
Olympic bronze medalists for Switzerland
Olympic medalists in freestyle skiing
Freestyle skiers at the 2016 Winter Youth Olympics
X Games athletes
Sportspeople from the canton of Fribourg